The Way to Paradise is a novel published by Mario Vargas Llosa in 2003.

The novel is a historical double biography of Post-Impressionist painter Paul Gauguin and his grandmother Flora Tristan, one of the founders of feminism. The book is divided into 22 chapters, each alternating narratives of Flora Tristan and Paul Gauguin, the grandson she never knew as he was born after she died. Flora Tristan, illegitimate daughter of a wealthy Peruvian man and a French woman, is repelled by sex, detests her husband, and abandons him to then later fight for women's and workers' rights. The story of Paul Gauguin unfolds along a similar quest for an ideal life. Gauguin abandons his wife and children, and job as a stock-broker in Paris, to pursue his passion for painting. In the process he does his best to distances himself from European civilization, fleeing to Tahiti and French Polynesia for inspiration. The contrasts and similarities between two lives attempting to break free from  conventional society present a long, elegant development.

Translations
Written in Spanish the English translation was by Natasha Wimmer and was published by Faber and Faber in 2004.
The French translation by Albert Bensoussan is called Le Paradis, un peu plus loin.
It has also been translated into German by Elke Wehr as Das Paradies ist anderswo.  In Spanish, the book's title literally means: "The Paradise in the Other Corner".
In Bulgarian, the title is "Рая зад другия ъгъл".

Awards and honors
The New York Times listed The Way to Paradise as a Notable Book of the Year. In 2010, Vargas Llosa won the Nobel Prize in Literature.

See also 
 William Somerset Maugham's 1919 novel The Moon and Sixpence is also based on the life of Paul Gauguin.

References 

2003 novels
Novels by Mario Vargas Llosa
Historical novels
Novels about artists
Novels about writers
Novels set in the 19th century
Novels set in Peru
Novels set in Tahiti
Faber and Faber books
Cultural depictions of Paul Gauguin